Wodak may refer to:

People
 Ruth Wodak (born 1950), distinguished Professor and Chair in Discourse Studies at Lancaster University
 Alex Wodak, physician and director of the Alcohol and Drug Service, St Vincent's Hospital, Sydney since 1982
 Shoshana Wodak, BA in Chemical physics, Université libre de Bruxelles
 Ersnt Arnost Wodak, surgeon
 Natasha Wodak (born 1981), Canadian long-distance runner